Alice David (born 22 March 1987) is a French actress, known for the television series Bref (2011) and the film Babysitting (2014). She is the voice of the French dub of Lara Croft in the video game Tomb Raider.

Filmography

References

External links

 

1987 births
Living people
French film actresses
French television actresses
French stage actresses
21st-century French actresses
Actresses from Paris